Robert Vance Honeycutt IV (born May 17, 2003) is an American college baseball outfielder for the North Carolina Tar Heels.

Early life and amateur career
Honeycutt grew up in Salisbury, North Carolina and attended Salisbury High School, where he played baseball and was the starting quarterback on the football team. He committed to play college baseball at the University of North Carolina during his sophomore year. Honeycutt passed for 11 touchdowns and rushed for 19 during his senior football season as Salisbury won the Class AA state championship. Honeycutt was selected by the San Francisco Giants in the 20th round of the 2021 Major League Baseball draft, but he opted not to sign and enroll at North Carolina.

As a freshman for the North Carolina Tar Heels, Honeycutt batted .296 with a school-record 25 home runs, 57 runs batted in (RBIs), and 29 stolen bases. He was the first player in UNC history to have 20 home runs and 20 stolen bases in the same season and was named third-team All-Atlantic Coast Conference (ACC). Honeycutt was named the most valuable player of the 2022 ACC tournament after hitting .400 with four home runs and 10 RBIs. After the season, he was selected for the United States collegiate national team. Honeycutt entered his sophomore season as the ACC Preseason Player of the Year.

Personal life
Honeycutt's father, Bob, also played baseball at UNC. His mother, Leah Ann, ran track for the Tar Heels. Honeycutt's two older sisters both played on UNC's women's soccer team.

References

External links

North Carolina Tar Heels bio

North Carolina Tar Heels baseball players
Baseball players from North Carolina
Baseball outfielders
2003 births
Living people